The statue of Winston Churchill in Woodford, London, is a bronze sculpture of the British statesman, created by David McFall in 1958–9. The statue commemorates Churchill's role as the member for the parliamentary constituency of Woodford. Churchill was elected to the Epping seat in 1924 and held it until 1945 when the new constituency of Woodford was created. Churchill then held this seat until his retirement in 1964. The statue  is a Grade II listed structure.

History
Winston Churchill's parliamentary career began at age 25, when he won the northern seat of Oldham as a Conservative candidate in the 1900 general election. It ended 64 years later in October 1964 at age 90, when he decided, at the instigation of family and friends, not to contest the 1964 general election, and ceased to be MP for Woodford. His parliamentary career was unconventional: elected a Tory in 1900, in May 1904 he crossed the floor to become a senior member of the Liberal Party. By 1924, he had left the Liberals, and in October he stood as an independent Constitutionalist, winning the seat of Epping, on the Essex/London border. Subsequently, re-joining the Tory Party, he held this seat until its abolition under parliamentary reorganisation in 1945, and then won the successor seat of Woodford, which he held until his final retirement in 1964.

In 1958, the Sir Winston Churchhill Commemoration Fund commissioned David McFall (1919–1988) to sculpt a statue of Churchill to be placed in the Woodford constituency. McFall had previously trained under Eric Gill and then collaborated with Jacob Epstein. McFall worked initially from photographs, before Churchill allowed a number of personal sittings at Chartwell, his country home in Kent. The sittings, after which McFall produced six busts of Churchill in addition to the Woodford statue, were the last Churchill ever permitted. The statue was unveiled by Field Marshal Bernard Montgomery, 1st Viscount Montgomery of Alamein, on 30 October 1959. Churchill attended the ceremony and made a short speech focused on the gradual dissolution of the British Empire and on Britain's own future place in the world. The statue was one of only two of Churchill completed and unveiled in his lifetime.

In the 21st century the statue has been the subject of occasional vandalism. In 2009 it was chosen as the symbol of the London Borough of Redbridge for the 2012 London Olympics.

Reception

Initial reactions to photographs of the work in progress were unfavourable, including those of members of Churchill's own family. Clementine Churchill, a fierce defender of her husband's reputation and public image, wrote to McFall suggesting that the face was "a caricature of Winston" and requesting changes. McFall made alterations, and Lady Churchilll adjusted her opinion (see box). The reaction at the unveiling, and subsequently, was more positive; Pathé News reported in its contemporary account that "the essence of Sir Winston is caught in the brilliant sculpture by David McFall". Churchill's own comment on the statue at the unveiling ceremony was, "very nice". Historic England describes the statue as a "highly regarded, purposeful, yet sympathetic sculptural representation of Britain's iconic war-time Prime Minister in his later years".

Description
It stands on a plinth of Cornish granite. Churchill is depicted in a three-piece suit, walking in the gardens at Chartwell. An inscription on the front of the plinth reads "WINSTON S. CHURCHILL", and another on the reverse reads "McFALL 1959". The sculpture is a Grade II listed structure.

Footnotes

References

Sources

External links

 People in the News 1959 – Pathé News coverage of the unveiling of the statue in October 1959

1959 sculptures
Bronze sculptures in London
Cultural infrastructure completed in 1959
Churchill, Winston
Grade II listed monuments and memorials
Monuments and memorials in London
Outdoor sculptures in London
Churchill, Winston
London, Woodford
Vandalized works of art in the United Kingdom
1959 in London